Lechenaultia ovata is a species of flowering plant in the family Goodeniaceae and is endemic to the Northern Territory. It is a perennial herb with rather fleshy, egg-shaped leaves, and white flowers.

Description

Taxonomy
Lechenaultia ovata was first formally described in 1988 by David A. Morrison in the journal Telopea from specimens collected near Jabiru by Lyndley Craven in 1973. The specific epithet (ovata) means "wider below the middle".

Distribution and habitat
This leschenaultia grows with sedges in sandy depressions in a few places on the Top End of the Northern Territory.

Conservation status
This leschenaultia is listed as of "least concern" under the Northern Territory Territory Parks and Wildlife Conservation Act 1976.

References

Asterales of Australia
lutescens
Flora of the Northern Territory
Plants described in 1988